Kapetanović is a Bosnian/Croatian/Serbian surname meaning "captain's son".

It may refer to:

 Aret Kapetanovic (born Emma Komlosy), British singer/songwriter
 Domagoj Kapetanović (born 1926-2005), Croatian footballer and manager
 Goran Kapetanović (born 1974), Bosnian-Swedish writer and film director
 Mehmed-beg Kapetanović Ljubušak (1839–1902), Bosniak author and public official
 Mirza Kapetanović (born 1959), Bosnian former footballer
 Nemanja Kapetanović (born 1997), Serbian basketball player
 Sead Kapetanović (born 1972), Bosnian former footballer
 Selma Kapetanović (born 1996), Bosnian footballer

See also 
 Ivana Kapitanović, Croatian handballer

Bosnian surnames
Croatian surnames
Montenegrin surnames
Serbian surnames